Positive adult development is a subfield of developmental psychology that studies positive development during adulthood. It is one of four major forms of adult developmental study that can be identified, according to Michael Commons; the other three forms are directionless change, stasis, and decline. Commons divided positive adult developmental processes into at least six areas of study: hierarchical complexity (i.e., orders or stages), knowledge, experience, expertise, wisdom, and spirituality.

The development of people has focused on children and adolescence with several theories as proposed by Freud, Piaget, and Binet.  Research in positive adult development supports the theory that development occurs during adulthood. Recent studies indicate that such development is useful in predicting things such as an individual's health, life satisfaction, and degree of contribution to the society. In those studies, those that were older rated higher than those that were younger, thus supporting that there is indeed a positive development that occurs in adulthood.

Development of the field

Origins of the field 
This field stems originally from several threads of work within psychology. Erik Erikson proposed a number of adult periods. Daniel Levinson had described a number of "seasons of life." Abraham Maslow proposed an adult needs hierarchy. Jean Piaget came to agree that there were adult postformal stages beyond the stage of formal operations; his earlier theory had located an endpoint to the development of cognitive structures in the adolescent's acquisition of formal operations. John L. Horn found that crystallized intelligence, represented by such things as vocabulary size, increased in adulthood. Robert Kegan combined a Piagetian and an existential-phenomenological approach to create what he called constructive-developmental psychology. Lawrence Kohlberg found that in early adulthood, some people come to think of moral, ethical and societal issues in multivariate terms (Systematic stage 11, the first postformal stage). They use multiple relations. During middle adulthood some people become principled reasoners about moral issues; for instance, they used abstract principles to relate systems of rights to systems of duties (Metasystematic stage 12, the second postformal stage). Likewise, Cheryl Armon found that by middle adulthood, some people could reason about interpersonal relationships at an order of complexity similar to that described by Lawrence Kohlberg.

Research on positive adult development grew and expanded upon these early threads in a number of directions. Summaries of some of that initial positive adult development research can be found in Commons, Richards, and Armon, as well as in Alexander and Langer. Four postformal adult stages of development beyond the formal stage have been discovered in a wide variety of domains. The total number of stages across the life span now stands at 15. Periods and Seasons have been described.

A number of edited books were written on the topic of positive adult development in the 1990s and more recently. In the past decade, researchers have turned to investigating methods to foster positive development in educational and organizational settings, rather than just describe it and/or measure it. These methods are used in organizational and educational setting. Some use developmentally-designed, structured public discourse to address complex public issues.

Directions of change in positive adult development 

To determine whether a particular development in adulthood is positive or not, a value-judgment must be made about what kind of change in adult life is optimal or beneficial, and correspondingly what changes in adulthood are negative or deleterious. There are several competing standards for what constitutes positive development in adulthood, which can be broadly grouped into five directions; orthogenetic (becoming more hierarchically complex), selective/adaptive (becoming more likely to pass on your genes and for offspring to survive and thrive), veridical (becoming less biased in your view of the world), eudemonic (becoming happier and healthier) and virtuous (becoming a better person from a particular moral or ethical standpoint).

Studies have been conducted on various components of adult development. One such focused on the relationship between experiences and optimism. Another study (Helson, 2001), presented three positive "paths" each adult individual follows in development. These three paths were created using Environmental Mastery (EM) and Personal Growth (PG) scales developed by Carol D. Ryff. The three paths, identified as "Achievers", "Conservers", and "Seekers", were formulated from the patterns that resulted when Ryff's EM and PG tests were administered in the study. The Achievers scored high on both scales. The Conservers scored high on EM and low of PG. The Seekers scored low of EM and high on PG. All three paths were unique but all equally positive. This distinction was concluded to be the result of individual skill and motivation, with each individual's personal action creating personal strengths and personality features. The attributes of emotionality (both positive and negative), processes of identity, and the alterations in self-control across the adulthood years predicted the path classifications. Additionally, each path consisted of a strength profile on the "four criteria of maturity", being competence, generativity, ego development, and wisdom.

Measurements in positive adult development 

Assessment of positive adult development can measure quantitative or qualitative change. Measurements of quantitative change assess change on a defined continuous variable, such as IQ, reaction time, or indicators of personality maturity such as authenticity or self-actualization. Quantitative change can be discontinuous, if a sudden step-change is in value, or continuous when changes occur gradually and incrementally.

Qualitative change is evidenced by a change in kind, rather than a change in amount, as exemplified by the switch from caterpillar to butterfly. Assessments of qualitative change in adulthood involve assigning written or numerical data to a stage within a defined stage model, according to defined assessment criteria. Researchers have developed a number of such instruments and methods to measure adult development stages, such as the moral judgment interview of Kohlberg, the Berlin Wisdom Interview, the Washington University Sentence Completion Test, the Subject-Object Interview, and the model of hierarchical complexity.

Notes

References 

Developmental psychology